John Marino (born May 21, 1997) is an American professional ice hockey defenseman currently playing for the New Jersey Devils in the National Hockey League (NHL). He was drafted by the Edmonton Oilers, 154th overall, in the 2015 NHL Entry Draft.

Playing career

Amateur
Marino played junior hockey with the South Shore Kings in the United States Premier Hockey League before he was selected in the fifth-round, 154th overall, by the Edmonton Oilers in the 2015 NHL Entry Draft. After a single season with the Tri-City Storm in the United States Hockey League (USHL), he committed to a collegiate career with Harvard University of the ECAC.

Marino played college hockey at Harvard from 2016 to 2019. He scored his first collegiate goal on October 28, 2016 against Arizona State. In 2016–17, Marino was named Second Team All-Ivy League.

Professional

Pittsburgh Penguins
On July 26, 2019, Marino was acquired by the Pittsburgh Penguins in exchange for a sixth round pick. On August 8, 2019, he left the college ranks as he was signed to a two-year, entry-level contract with the Penguins.

Marino made his NHL debut on October 8, 2019, in Pittsburgh's game against the Winnipeg Jets. He scored his first NHL goal on November 4, 2019 against the Boston Bruins.  

Prior to the start of the 2021–22 season, Marino trained with Brian Dumoulin in Boston. Together, they would skate before working out at the home gym in Dumoulin's garage in Charlestown. On January 3, 2021, Marino signed a six-year, $26.4 million contract extension with the Penguins.

New Jersey Devils
On July 16, 2022, Marino was traded by the Penguins to the New Jersey Devils in return for Ty Smith and a 2023 third-round pick.

Personal life
Marino has a twin brother.

Career statistics

Awards and honours

References

External links
 

1997 births
Living people
American men's ice hockey defensemen
American people of Italian descent
Edmonton Oilers draft picks
Harvard Crimson men's ice hockey players
New Jersey Devils players
Pittsburgh Penguins players
Tri-City Storm players
Twin sportspeople
American twins
Ice hockey players from Massachusetts